Dyseuaresta is a genus of tephritid  or fruit flies in the family Tephritidae.

Species
Dyseuaresta adelphica (Hendel, 1914)
Dyseuaresta apicalis Hendel, 1928
Dyseuaresta bilineata (Foote, 1982)
Dyseuaresta caracasana (Foote, 1980)
Dyseuaresta fuscoapicalis Hering, 1942
Dyseuaresta gephyrae (Hendel, 1914)
Dyseuaresta impluviata (Blanchard, 1854)
Dyseuaresta mexicana (Wiedemann, 1830)
Dyseuaresta signifera Hering, 1937
Dyseuaresta sobrinata (Wulp, 1900)
Dyseuaresta tenuis (Loew, 1873)
Dyseuaresta trinotata Bates, 1934

References

Tephritinae
Tephritidae genera
Diptera of South America
Diptera of North America